Harold Francis Falls (November 25, 1909 in Winchester, Indiana – May 27, 2006 in Brighton, Michigan) was an American ophthalmologist and geneticist. He helped found one of the first genetics clinic in US. The Nettleship-Falls syndrome, the most common type of ocular albinism, is named after him and English ophthalmologist Edward Nettleship.

References
 Who Named It?, Harold Francis Falls
 University of Michigan Obituary 

American ophthalmologists
1909 births
2006 deaths
People from Winchester, Indiana
University of Michigan faculty
University of Michigan Medical School alumni